Mount Osborn is the highest point in the Kigluaik Mountains, and also on the Seward Peninsula. It is approximately 4714 feet high and is located on the north end of the range. Despite being almost one thousand feet taller, Osborn's fame is matched by Mount Bendeleben (located east of the Kigluaiks) because Bendeleben is much taller than any of the peaks in its territory.


See also

List of mountain peaks of North America
List of mountain peaks of the United States
List of mountain peaks of Alaska

References

External links

Mountains of Alaska
Landforms of Nome Census Area, Alaska
Mountains of Unorganized Borough, Alaska
Landforms of the Seward Peninsula